Amriswil railway station is a railway station in Amriswil, in the Swiss canton of Thurgau. It is an intermediate stop on the Winterthur–Romanshorn line and is served by local and long-distance trains.

Services 
 the following services stop at Amriswil:

 St. Gallen S-Bahn:
 : hourly service between Weinfelden and Rorschach.
 : half-hourly service between Wil and Romanshorn.
 Zürich S-Bahn:
 : peak-hour service between Zürich main station and  via .

References

External links 
 
 

Railway stations in Switzerland opened in 1855
Railway stations in the canton of Thurgau
Swiss Federal Railways stations